Lagache is a surname. Notable people with the surname include:

Alfred Lagache (1889 –1971),  French professional three-cushion billiards player
André Lagache (1885–1938), French racing driver
Daniel Lagache (1903–1972), French physician, psychoanalyst and professor at the Sorbonne

See also 
Chardon Lagache (Paris Métro), station on the Paris Métro
Monchy-Lagache, commune in the Somme department in Hauts-de-France in northern France